Bicyclus sealeae is a butterfly in the family Nymphalidae. It is found in Equatorial Guinea.

References

Elymniini
Butterflies described in 2008
Endemic fauna of Equatorial Guinea
Butterflies of Africa